The Australian Silver Kangaroo is a one troy ounce silver bullion coin minted by the Royal Australian Mint in Canberra, Australia. They have legal tender status in Australia and are one of few legal tender bullion silver coins to change their design every year. This and their limited annual mintage may, unlike for many other bullion coins, raise their numismatic value over the value of silver used.

The Silver Kangaroo series was introduced in 1993 by the Royal Australian Mint, an agency wholly owned and run by the Commonwealth Government of Australia. Silver Kangaroo coins are usually issued in two forms: a proof coin and a frosted uncirculated coin, although coins with selective gold plating have also been issued from 2003.
The purity of the coin was 99.9% until 2014, then it has been increased to 99.99% from 2015.

Mintage Numbers 
Kangaroo 2016 — 20,000
Kangaroo 2015 — 20,000
Kangaroo 2014 — 20,000
Kangaroo 2013 — 20,000
Kangaroo 2012 — 20,000
Kangaroo 2011 — 20,000
Kangaroo 2010 — 20,000
Kangaroo 2009 — 20,000
Kangaroo 2008 — 6,802
Kangaroo 2007 — 8,598
Kangaroo 2006 — 25,535
Kangaroo 2005 — 26,146
Kangaroo 2004 — 55,057
Kangaroo 2003 — 35,230
Kangaroo 2002 — 32,376
Kangaroo 2001 — 45,562
Kangaroo 2000 — 42,638
Kangaroo 1999 — 49,398
Kangaroo 1998 — 49,398
Kangaroo 1997 — 72,850
Kangaroo 1996 — 49,398
Kangaroo 1995 — 72,850 + Coin Fair — 2,500
Kangaroo 1994 — 44,996 + Coin Fair — 2,500
Kangaroo 1993 — 72,853 + Coin Fair — 5,000

See also

 Bullion
 Bullion coin
 Inflation hedge
 Types of Silver Coins

References

External links
 Royal Australian Mint
 Australian Silver Kangaroo Coin Pictures

Silver coins
Coins of Australia